Pyrga may refer to:

Pyrga, Famagusta, Cyprus
Pyrga, Larnaca, Cyprus